The Philippines participated at the 2017 Summer Universiade in Taipei, Taiwan, from 19 to 30 August 2017.

University of Baguio student and wushu practitioner, Jomar Balangui won a silver medal in the men’s sanda 52-kg event which is the sole medal for the Philippines in this edition of the Universiade.

Medal summary

Team

References

External links 
 NUSF Overview — Philippines

Philippines at the Summer Universiade
2017 in Philippine sport
Nations at the 2017 Summer Universiade